Warren Humphreys (born 1 April 1952) is an English professional golfer.

Humphreys was born in Kingston. He had a successful amateur career, winning the 1971 English Amateur, and playing on that year's winning Great Britain & Ireland Walker Cup team. 

He turned professional towards the end of 1971. Humphreys made the top one hundred on the European Tour Order of Merit thirteen times, with a best ranking of twentieth in 1973. His sole European Tour tournament victory came at the 1985 Portuguese Open.

Golf Broadcasting
Since retiring from tournament golf he has worked as a golf broadcaster, for Sky Sports and The Golf Channel.

Amateur wins
1971 English Amateur, Lytham Trophy, Duncan Putter

Professional wins (1)

European Tour wins (1)

Playoff record
Sunshine Tour playoff record (0–1)

Results in major championships

Note: Humphreys only played in The Open Championship.

CUT = missed the half-way cut (3rd round cut in 1969, 1973, 1982, 1983 and 1984 Open Championships)
"T" indicates a tie for a place

Team appearances
Amateur
Walker Cup (representing Great Britain & Ireland): 1971 (winners)
St Andrews Trophy (representing Great Britain & Ireland): 1970 (winners)
European Amateur Team Championship (representing England): 1971 (winners)

References

External links

English male golfers
European Tour golfers
Golf writers and broadcasters
People from Kingston upon Thames
People from Binfield
1952 births
Living people